Mark Atkinson (born 8 March 1990) is an English professional rugby union player who currently plays for Gloucester in the Gallagher Premiership and England. Atkinson attended Saint Ambrose College in Cheshire during his early life.

He first started for Sale Sharks in 2008 before joining Wasps in 2010 in the Aviva Premiership. He left Wasps to join Esher RFC in the RFU Championship from the 2011/12 season. Afterwards, he joined Bedford Blues from the 2012-13 season. In 2014, Atkinson returned to the Premiership as he signs for Gloucester Rugby from the 2014-15 season.

On 27 May 2019, Atkinson was named in the Barbarians squad to face England in a friendly at Twickenham Stadium.

He was called up to the senior England squad in September 2021 for a training camp.
Due to a last minute squad change, Atkinson made his debut off the bench against Tonga on 6 November 2021, earning his first cap for England.

References

External links
Bedford Blues profile
Gloucester Rugby profile
Its Rugby Profile

1990 births
Living people
Barbarian F.C. players
Bedford Blues players
English rugby union players
Gloucester Rugby players
Rugby union players from Knowsley, Merseyside
Wasps RFC players
Sale Sharks players
People educated at St. Ambrose College
Rugby union centres
England international rugby union players